Kadet was the second children's channel of Medialaan-De Persgroep (now DPG Media), which was launched on December 18, 2015 to replace the channel JIM.

In December 2018, Medialaan rebranded its two children's channels, vtmKZOOM and Kadet, as VTM Kids and VTM Kids Jr.

History
After fourteen years the youth channel JIM stopped on December 16 midnight, because adolescents are more into adult channels and online entertainment. On December 18 at 16:00 Medialaan launched Kadet. Medialaan has developed a content deal with Disney. Daan Van Leeuwen became the head of the children's channels within Medialaan and will continue to develop both Kadet and vtmKzoom in the future. Van Leeuwen used to be programs director of Fox Kids and Jetix Netherlands.

In December 2018, Medialaan rebranded its two children's channels, vtmKZOOM and Kadet. The vtmKZOOM and Kadet brands were retired and replaced by VTM Kids and VTM Kids Jr.

Programming

Kadet broadcast mostly programs which can also be seen on Disney XD.

References

External links
 Official website

Children's television networks
Defunct television channels in Belgium
Television channels in Flanders
Television channels in Belgium
Television channels and stations established in 2015
Television channels and stations disestablished in 2018
Vilvoorde